CFKS-DT, virtual and UHF digital channel 30, is a Noovo owned-and-operated television station licensed to Sherbrooke, Quebec, Canada, operating as a de facto semi-satellite of Montreal flagship station CFJP-DT. The station is owned by the Bell Media subsidiary of BCE Inc. CFKS-DT's studios are located on Boulevard Industriel/Route 220 and Boulevard de Portland in Sherbrooke, and its transmitter is located in Orford. On cable, the station is available on Vidéotron channel 5 and in high-definition on digital channel 605.

History
The station went to air on September 7, 1986. It was originally launched by Cogeco as a private affiliate of TQS, which was then owned by Jean Pouliot. It became an owned-and-operated station of the network in 2001 when Cogeco became the network's primary owner. The station was part of V's takeover by Remstar. Since the rebranding of the TQS network on August 31, 2009, CFKS has dropped all non-network programming and became a de facto semi-satellite of Montreal owned-and-operated station CFJP-TV.

Former local programming
 Le Grand Journal Estrie (1989–Fall 2009) Local news show, aired weekdays at 5:30 p.m.
 Les Infos (Fall 2008–Fall 2009) Two-minute local news capsules, aired weekdays at 6:45 a.m., 7:30 a.m., 7:45 a.m., 8:30 a.m., and 11:56 a.m.
 Le Reflet de l'Estrie (Fall 2008–Fall 2009) Weekly news summary with feature reports, airs Sundays at 9:30 a.m.

Digital television 
CFKS-DT ceased broadcasting in analog and flash cut to digital on August 1, 2011. Through the use of PSIP, digital television receivers display CFKS-TV's virtual channel as 30.1.

In filings from V to the CRTC with respect to Broadcasting Notice of Consultation CRTC 2010-169, V stated that it was debating whether to install digital a transmitter in Saguenay due to financial reasons, and if it did install one, it might by the deadline or well after the deadline. V later filed regarding the same proceeding that it was in talks with Télé-Québec to partner up in order to reduce the cost of installing transmitters.

References

External links
 

FKS
FKS
Television channels and stations established in 1986
1986 establishments in Quebec